USS Walrus has been the name of more than one United States Navy ship, and may refer to:

 USS Walrus (SS-35), renamed  before launching, a submarine in commission from 1914 to 1923
 , a proposed submarine cancelled in 1944.
 , a submarine launched in 1946 but never completed and stricken in 1958
 USS Walrus, a fictional submarine in the 1955 novel Run Silent, Run Deep by Edward L, Beach, Jr.

United States Navy ship names